Roy Lonergan (6 December 1909 – 22 October 1956) was an Australian cricketer. He played 43 first-class matches for New South Wales and South Australia between 1929/30 and 1935/36.

References

External links
 

1909 births
1956 deaths
Australian cricketers
New South Wales cricketers
South Australia cricketers
Cricketers from Perth, Western Australia